The 1988–89 Memphis State Tigers men's basketball team represented Memphis State University as a member of the Metro Conference during the 1988–89 NCAA Division I men's basketball season.

The Tigers received an at-large bid to the 1989 NCAA tournament and finished with a 21–11 record (8–4 Metro).

Roster

Schedule and results

|-
!colspan=9 | Regular Season
|-

|-
!colspan=9 | Metro Conference Tournament
|-

|-
!colspan=9 | NCAA Tournament
|-

Rankings

References

Memphis Tigers men's basketball seasons
1988 in sports in Tennessee
1989 in sports in Tennessee
Memphis State
Memphis State